Abby's Flower Tower (formerly Jazzy Jellies)  is a flower themed spinning samba tower ride located in Sesame Street at SeaWorld Orlando in the United States. Manufactured by Zamperla, the ride lifts and spins riders to heights of 30 feet in the air. Jazzy Jellies was opened to the public in 2006. It closed in 2018 to retheme the ride to Abby's Flower Tower as part of the changing from Shamu’s Happy Harbor to Sesame Street Land.

History

In 2006, SeaWorld Orlando announced plans to add three family rides in the Shamu's Happy Harbour area - Jazzy Jellies, a jellyfish-themed samba tower ride, the Shamu Express, a killer whale-themed junior roller coaster and Swishy Fishies, a teacup ride waterspout-themed teacup ride as well as four stories of nets and tunnels, a huge sand box, and a playful pirate ship.

The Jazzy Jellies ride was opened to the public at the end of the year in 2006. It was manufactured by Zamperla, an Italy-based thrill rides and roller coasters manufacturing company.

In May 2017, it was announced that Shamu's Happy Harbor became converted into Sesame Street Land.

On April 8, 2018 the ride, alongside the Shamu Express roller coaster closed as part of the retheming of Shamu's Happy Harbor into the Sesame Street Land area. The ride reopened as Abby's Flower Tower on March 27, 2019 along with the rest of the area.

Attraction summary

Ride 
Abby's Flower Tower is a balloon style ride that can lift up a tower and can spin through the visitor's controls. There are eight Flower pot themed tea cups for the riders which lifts and spins riders to heights of 30 feet in the air. The duration of the ride is about 1 minute. It is open for kids that are around 14 years old and older. The riders must be at least 42 inches tall or accompanied by a supervising companion at least 14 years old to ride.

See also
 SeaWorld
 SeaWorld Orlando

References

External links
 

Amusement rides introduced in 2006
Amusement rides introduced in 2019
SeaWorld Orlando
Amusement rides manufactured by Zamperla
2006 establishments in Florida
2018 disestablishments in Florida